Pedro Nuno Milheiro Silva Maia (born 1 February 1972) is a retired Portuguese football striker.

References

1972 births
Living people
People from Maia, Portugal
Portuguese footballers
Leça F.C. players
S.C. Dragões Sandinenses players
Association football forwards
Primeira Liga players
Sportspeople from Porto District